Vanda Lukács (born 8 December 1992) is a Hungarian tennis player.

She has won seven singles and seven doubles titles on the ITF Circuit. On 20 March 2017, she reached a career-high singles ranking of world No. 369. On 12 September 2016, she peaked at No. 396 in the doubles rankings.

Lukács made her WTA Tour main-draw debut at the 2011 Budapest Grand Prix. Having been awarded a wildcard, she played against Ajla Tomljanović in the first round, losing in straight sets.

ITF finals

Singles: 14 (7 titles, 7 runner–ups)

Doubles: 14 (7 titles, 7 runner–ups)

Junior career

ITF Junior Circuit finals

Singles (2–0)

References
 
 

1992 births
Living people
Hungarian female tennis players
21st-century Hungarian women